Sarah Song (born 9 August 1985) is a Chinese-Australian television host, actress, professional MC, and beauty pageant titleholder who was crowned Miss Chinese International 2007. Previously Song was crowned Miss Sydney Chinese 2006.

Early life
Song was born in Guangzhou, China, and immigrated to Sydney, Australia with her parents at age 6.  Song attended the all-girls high school, Pymble Ladies' College and graduated in 2003. She attended the University of New South Wales for a Bachelor of Commerce in Services Marketing, but dropped out after winning Miss Chinese International to develop her career in Hong Kong.

Pageantry
Song competed in Miss Sydney Chinese 2006 as No. 1 where she won the crown. After winning Miss Sydney Chinese, she earned the right to represent Sydney at Miss Chinese International 2007, held in Foshan, China. Song won the competition, beating out first runner-up Ivy Lu from Johannesburg, South Africa, and second runner-up Sherry Chen from Toronto, Canada. She also won the Chinese Culture Ambassador Award.

Career
After winning Miss Chinese International, Song signed with broadcasting giant TVB in Hong Kong. She began co-hosting the daily current affairs program The Scoop 東張西望, and the English-language lifestyle program Dolce Vita on TVB Pearl. She has hosted over 30 variety programs for TVB. Song is also a professional MC for corporate and brand marketing events.

After 12 years working at TVB, Song left TVB in September 2019. She and her husband Jason Chan Chi-sun have a YouTube channel with over 130,000 subscribers.

Filmography

References

External links
 http://m.weibo.cn/u/1733506821

1985 births
Australian people of Chinese descent
Actresses from Sydney
People from Heshan
Actresses from Guangzhou
Living people
University of New South Wales alumni
Miss Chinese International winners
TVB actors
People with acquired residency of Hong Kong
Actresses from Guangdong
Australian television actresses
Hong Kong television actresses
Chinese television actresses
21st-century Chinese actresses
21st-century Hong Kong actresses
People educated at Pymble Ladies' College
Australian actresses of Asian descent